Harold Faragher (20 July 1917 – 24 February 2006) was an English cricketer. He played for Essex between 1949 and 1950.

References

External links

1917 births
2006 deaths
English cricketers
Essex cricketers
People from Reddish